The Jeju Islamic Cultural Center or Jeju Islamic Center (JICC) is an Islamic cultural center in Nohyeong, Jeju City, Jeju Province, South Korea.

History
The center was founded in 1994 by Kim Dae-yong.

Architecture
The center is located on the 12th floor of Jeonghan Officitel building. It also features a surau.

Activities
The center provides a prayer room for Muslim visitors and also Muslim-related tourism services when visiting the island.

See also
 Islam in South Korea

References

External links
 

1994 establishments in South Korea
Buildings and structures in Jeju Province
Cultural centers
Culture in Jeju Province
Islamic organizations established in 1994
Islam in South Korea
Jeju City